The World Administrative Radio Conference (WARC) bands are three portions of the shortwave radio spectrum used by licensed and/or certified amateur radio operators. They consist of 30 meters (10.100–10.150 MHz), 17 meters (18.068–18.168 MHz)  and 12 meters (24.890–24.990 MHz). They were named after the World Administrative Radio Conference, which in 1979 created a worldwide allocation of these bands for amateur use. The bands were opened for use in the early 1980s. Due to their relatively small bandwidth of 100 kHz or less, there is a gentlemen's agreement that the WARC bands may not be used for general contesting. This agreement has been codified in official recommendations, such as the IARU Region 1 HF Manager's Handbook, which states: "Contest activity shall not take place on the 5,  10, 18 and 24 MHz bands."

Non-contesting radio amateurs are recommended to use the contest-free HF bands (30, 17, and 12m) during the largest international contests.

12-meter band plan

IARU Region 1

IARU Region 2

Canada
Canada is part of region 2 and as such is subject to the IARU band plan. Radio Amateurs of Canada offers the bandplan below as a recommendation for use by radio amateurs in that country.

United States
The United States is part of ITU Region 2 and as such is subject to the IARU band plan. The Amateur Radio Relay League offers the bandplan below as a recommendation for use by radio amateurs in that country.

IARU Region 3

17-meter band plan

IARU Region 1

IARU Region 2

Canada
Canada is part of region 2 and as such is subject to the IARU band plan.  Radio Amateurs of Canada offers the bandplan below as a recommendation for use by radio amateurs in that country.

United States
The United States is part of ITU Region 2 and as such is subject to the IARU band plan. The Amateur Radio Relay League offers the bandplan below as a recommendation for use by radio amateurs in that country.

IARU Region 3

30-meter band plan

IARU Region 1

Throughout most of the world, the 30 meter band generally cannot be used for "phone" (voice) communications. SSB may be used during emergencies involving the immediate safety of life and property and only by stations actually involved in the handling of emergency traffic.

However, a part of Region 1 is permitted to use phone at certain times.  The band segment 10.120 to 10.140 may only be used for SSB transmissions in the area of Africa south of the equator during local daylight hours.

IARU Region 2

Canada
Canada is part of Region 2 and as such is subject to the IARU band plan.  Radio Amateurs of Canada offers the bandplan below as a recommendation for use by radio amateurs in that country.

United States

The USA (Region 2) limits amateur radio users to 200 watts peak envelope power on this band.

IARU Region 3

Australia
Australia (VK, region 3) has a unique set of privileges on 30 meters which allows voice operation on a section of the band for advanced license holders. The digital segment is 10.130-10.150 MHz. The current band plan has telephony from 10.120–10.135 MHz, with CW only below 10.120. These are WIA  recommendations only as ACMA does not restrict Australian amateurs' modes within HF allocations beyond requiring less than 8 kHz occupied bandwidth per channel below 28 MHz.

Key for band plans

See also
Amateur radio frequency allocations
International Telecommunication Union
World Radiocommunication Conference
Regional Radiocommunication Conference
Radio Regulations
Federal Communications Commission
Radio Amateurs of Canada
Ofcom

References

External links
US Amateur Radio Bands

Amateur radio bands